My House is a 2015 South Korean television program starring Lee Sang-min, Lee Ji-ae, Julian Quintart and Kim Ye-won. It airs on JTBC on Tuesday at 0:30 beginning February 23, 2015.

Cast
 Lee Sang-min
 Lee Ji-ae
 Julian Quintart
 Kim Ye-won

References

External links
 

2015 South Korean television series debuts
Korean-language television shows
JTBC original programming